Burgruine Grafenstein is a medieval castle in Carinthia, Austria.

See also
List of castles in Austria

Castles in Carinthia (state)